Vrbice is a municipality and village in Litoměřice District in the Ústí nad Labem Region of the Czech Republic. It has about 500 inhabitants.

Administrative parts
Villages of Mastířovice and Vetlá are administrative parts of Vrbice.

References

Villages in Litoměřice District